Major John Fairfax-Blakeborough  (16 January 1883 in Guisborough – 1 January 1976 in Westerdale) a.k.a. "Jack" was an English writer and folklorist.

Biography
After leaving school he spent three months in a broker’s office and then joined the Middlesbrough Evening Telegraph (later the Evening Gazette). At twenty-one he became a freelance writer, specialising in country sports and horse racing.

From childhood, he had been interested in horses, racing and hunting and he gained practical experience of horses in a three-year spell at a training stable in Cleveland, in addition to his two days a week of hunting.

During the First World War he served as a Major in 15th/19th The King's Royal Hussars, being awarded the Military Cross. After the war he became a racing judge at Sedgefield and remained a licensed Turf official until shortly before his death. At the same time, he became secretary of the Cleveland Bay Horse Society, a post he held for twenty years, later becoming the Society’s president. He also owned, rode and raced his own horses.

He was the author of 112 books on the history of horse racing, Yorkshire folklore and the Cleveland Bay. Among the best known of these are Yorkshire Days and Yorkshire Ways (1935) and The Spirit of Yorkshire (1954, written with his son Richard Noel John Fairfax-Blakeborough). He also wrote regularly for the Darlington and Stockton Times (for 54 years) and for Yorkshire Life.

He died at his home, Low House, Westerdale, Whitby, on 1 January 1976.

References

External links
 Sheffield University
 Whitby Today

20th-century English writers
English folklorists
People from Whitby
Officers of the Order of the British Empire
Recipients of the Military Cross
1883 births
1976 deaths